Pongal may refer to:
 Pongal (festival), an annual Tamil festival
 Pongal (dish), a South Indian meal prepared from rice, milk and other ingredients
 Pongal River, a river in Espírito Santo, Brazil